The 1860 City of Auckland by-election was a by-election held  on 5 April in the  electorate in Auckland during the 2nd New Zealand Parliament.

The by-election was caused by the resignation of the incumbent, Thomas Beckham.

He was replaced by Archibald Clark.

Clark's opponent, Bernard Reynolds, was a member of the Auckland Provincial Council for the Pensioner Settlements.

Results

References

 

Auckland 1860
1860 elections in New Zealand
April 1860 events
Politics of the Auckland Region